"Religious and Famous" is a song by Christian rock band 7eventh Time Down from their second album, Just Say Jesus. It was released in 2014 as the album's third single.

Charts

2013 songs
7eventh Time Down songs